Empower is a service company which operates in energy, industry and telecom sectors in the Nordic countries and in the Baltic region. Empower is part of Enersense International Oyj.

History
Empower's roots are in a company called Pohjolan Voima. Its service company PVO-Palvelut Oy was named to Empower Oy in 1999.

Business
The Empower Group's business operations are divided into four areas:
 Telecom Network Services
 Industry Services
 Power Network Services

References 

Companies based in Helsinki
Service companies of Finland
1998 establishments in Finland